François Ouimet (born October 14, 1951) is a Canadian-born former professional ice hockey defenceman.

Career 
Ouimet played 25 games in the World Hockey Association with the Minnesota Fighting Saints and Cincinnati Stingers during the 1975–76 and 1976–77 seasons.

Career statistics

References

External links

1951 births
Living people
Canadian ice hockey defencemen
Cincinnati Stingers players
Columbus Owls players
Denver Spurs players
French Quebecers
Hampton Gulls (AHL) players
Hampton Gulls (SHL) players
Ice hockey people from Montreal
Johnstown Jets players
Minnesota Fighting Saints players
Rochester Americans players
Canadian expatriate ice hockey players in the United States